The Royal Purple Yearbook is the official yearbook of Kansas State University. The Royal Purple has won a number of awards, including several National Pacemaker Awards.  The Columbia Scholastic Press Association gave the 2006 Royal Purple a Silver Crown.  The Royal Purple is the official yearly record of Kansas State University. 

The Royal Purple's predecessor first appeared at Kansas State Agricultural College in 1891. The yearbook underwent several name changes, including The Sledge, Sunrise, The Bell Clapper, and The Banner. It became the Royal Purple in 1909. 

The Royal Purple was the first yearbook that included an opening section with yearly highlights in chronological order, "tilted" pictures, numerous "bleed" pages, news headlines, and a "tip-on"—an applied color picture placed on a cover; it was first used on the 1938 Royal Purple.  An embossed design on the division page, a trend of the 1980s, was used in the 1939 Royal Purple. The 1941 Royal Purple staff produced the first full-color lithograph cover in the United States. The 1994 Royal Purple used the first UV lamination. In 1997, the Royal Purple added a CD-ROM to its coverage, and in 2003 changed to a DVD supplement.

References

External links
 

Kansas State University
1891 establishments in Kansas
Yearbooks